The African United Baptist Church is a denominational body of Baptists in the Republic of Malawi. It is one of two schisms from the Providence Industrial Mission (forerunner of the African Baptist Assembly of Malawi, Inc.) of the National Baptist Convention, USA, Inc.   The formation of the African United Baptist Church occurred in 1946.

References

Baptist Christianity in Malawi
Baptist denominations in Africa
Baptist denominations established in the 20th century
Christian organizations established in 1946
1946 establishments in Nyasaland